Sir George Murray  (6 February 1772 – 28 July 1846) was a British soldier and politician from Scotland.

Background and education
Murray was born in Perth, Scotland, the second son of Sir William Murray, of Ochtertyre, 5th Baronet (see Murray Baronets), and was educated at the Royal High School, Edinburgh and the University of Edinburgh. His mother was Lady Augusta Mackenzie, youngest daughter of the Jacobite George, 3rd Earl of Cromartie. His elder brother was Sir Patrick Murray, 6th Baronet.

Military career
In 1789, Murray obtained a commission into the 71st Foot, reaching the rank of captain in 1794, and saw service in Flanders (1794–95), the West Indies, England and Ireland. In 1799, he was made a lieutenant-colonel, entering the Quartermaster General's Department and making his considerable reputation as Quartermaster General (1808–11) during the Peninsular War, under the Duke of Wellington, and receiving promotion to Colonel in 1809. After a brief period as Quartermaster General in Ireland, Murray returned to the Peninsular Campaign as Major-General (1813–14), and was invested with the Order of the Bath in 1813. During the Peninsular War he was present at the battles of A Coruña, Talavera, Busaco, Fuentes de Oñoro, Vittoria, Nivelle, Nive, Orthez and Toulouse. His Peninsular Gold Medal had six clasps – only the Duke of Wellington, with nine clasps, Sir Dennis Pack and Lord Beresford, with seven each, had more clasps to their medal.

He was briefly in Canada from December 1814 to May 1815 where he was appointed provisional Lieutenant-Governor of Upper Canada and reviewed the country's defences. He quickly returned to Europe following Napoleon's escape from Elba, but arrived too late to take part in the Battle of Waterloo.

After the cessation of hostilities, Murray was based in France as Chief of Staff to the Army of Occupation and, thereafter, he was appointed Governor of the Royal Military College, Sandhurst in 1819. He was awarded an honorary degree by the University of Oxford in 1820 and was elected a Fellow of the Royal Society in 1824. In 1825, he married Lady Louisa Erskine, widow of Sir James Erskine of Torrie (1772–1825). Subsequently, he was made Lieutenant-General of the Ordnance and then Commander-in-Chief, Ireland, but in 1828 he resigned the position and became Colonial Secretary. He was later Master-General of the Ordnance from 1834 to 1835 and again between 1841 and 1846.

Political career
Murray was a Tory and later Conservative in politics. He was Member of Parliament for Perthshire from 1824 to 1832 and from 1834 until he retired in 1835. He served as Secretary of State for War and the Colonies from 1828 to 1830. He also contested Westminster in 1837 and Manchester in both 1839 and 1841, without success.

Other public appointments
Murray was also President of the Royal Geographical Society (1833–35) and Governor of Edinburgh Castle. On 7 September 1829 he was appointed Governor of Fort George.

Personal life
Murray was married to Lady Louisa Erskine (née Paget) (1777-1842), widow of Lieutenant General Sir James Erskine (1772-1825), and sister of his fellow general, Henry, Lord Anglesey; the couple had one daughter, Louise Georgina. Murray died in July 1846, aged 74, and was buried in Kensal Green Cemetery, London. His substantial papers and maps were given to the National Library of Scotland by a great-niece in 1913.

Legacy
The Memorials to Governors in the Chapel of the present-day Royal Military Academy Sandhurst include:
In Memory of General the Right Hon. Sir George Murray, G.C.B., G.C H., Colonel 1st Royal Regiment of Foot. Died 28 July 1846, aged 74. He served in Holland, Egypt, Syria, the West Indies, Denmark, and Sweden ; wsLS Q.M.G. in the Peninsula; Commander-in-Chief in Canada; Chief of the Staff of the Army of Occupation in France ; Commander of the Forces in Ireland, and twice Master-General of the Ordnance. He was Governor of this College from 1819 to 1824.

The Murray River and Mount Murray in eastern Australia, the Murray River and Murray County in Western Australia, were named after him. Places in Hong Kong named after him include: Murray House, one of the oldest surviving public buildings in Hong Kong, Murray Building, Murray Road and the former Murray Barracks. The city of Perth, Western Australia was named in his honour after his parliamentary constituency Perthshire.

References

 Who's Who of British Members of Parliament: Volume I 1832–1885, edited by M. Stenton (The Harvester Press 1976)

Further reading

External links 

 
Sir George Murray at electricscotland.com

|-

|-

|-

|-

1772 births
1846 deaths
Military personnel from Perth, Scotland
People educated at the Royal High School, Edinburgh
Alumni of the University of Edinburgh
British Army commanders of the Napoleonic Wars
British Army personnel of the Peninsular War
Recipients of the Army Gold Cross
British Army generals
Commanders-in-Chief, Ireland
Scottish Tory MPs (pre-1912)
Fellows of the Royal Society
Governors of the Royal Military College, Sandhurst
Knights Grand Cross of the Order of the Bath
Lieutenant-Governors of Upper Canada
Members of the Privy Council of the United Kingdom
Members of the Privy Council of Ireland
Members of the Parliament of the United Kingdom for Scottish constituencies
Politics of Perth and Kinross
Presidents of the Royal Geographical Society
Secretaries of State for War and the Colonies
UK MPs 1820–1826
UK MPs 1826–1830
UK MPs 1830–1831
UK MPs 1831–1832
UK MPs 1832–1835
Younger sons of baronets
71st Highlanders officers
Commandants of Sandhurst
Black Watch officers
King's Royal Rifle Corps officers
Royal Scots officers
Seaforth Highlanders officers
Recipients of the Military Order of Max Joseph